Suya is a West African shish kebab dish.

Suya may also refer to:

Suyá, an indigenous people of Brazil
Suyá language, the language of the Suyá people
Suyá music, the music of the Suyá people

Places
Suya, Benin, arrondissement and town in Benin

People with the surname
Flora Suya, Malawian actress